2015 President's Cup may refer to:

 2015 President of Ireland's Cup, football
 2015 President's Cup (Maldives), football
 2015 President's Cup (tennis)